Where Light was Created: The Equidivium is the first album by The Lost Children of Babylon. Released in 2001 on Seventh Cathedral Recordings and later Re-mastered and Re-released on Babygrande Records in 2006. The album contains a conscious style, with lyrics filled with Nuwaubian teachings of Dr. Malachi Z. York and different theories of the creation and destination of the human soul. This album is similar in style to Jedi Mind Tricks "The Psycho-Social, Chemical, Biological & Electro-Magnetic Manipulation of Human Consciousness" album.

Track listing
Intro
Where The Light Was Created (Chapter 1)
Will You Be Prepared? (When The Elohim Return)
Egyptian Magic
Cosmic Consciousness
Gladiators - (with Luminous Flux)
As We Become One With The Sun
From The Womb OF El Kuluwm
Pythagorean Theorum, The
Book Of Black Light
Mystic Triad, The (Of Atum Re)
Heaven's Mirror - (with Luminous Flux/Society Park)
Stargate
Seven Thunders, The
Giving Praise (To Mother Nature)
Through The Eyes Of An Embryo

Babygrande Records albums
2006 debut albums
The Lost Children of Babylon albums